Mrinal Banerjee (1938 – 3 February 2010) was Power Minister in the Left Front Ministry in the Indian state of West Bengal.

He had joined politics as an employee of Durgapur Steel Plant. In spite of his qualifying as an associate member of the Institute of Engineers, he preferred to remain a worker and serve the trade union. He was general secretary of the Steel Workers Federation of India and secretary of the West Bengal State Committee of the Centre of Indian Trade Unions. In 1996, Jyoti Basu inducted him into the state cabinet as Minister for Industrial Reconstruction and State Public Undertakings.

He was elected on a CPI(M) ticket from the Durgapur I assembly constituency in 1996, 2001 and 2006.

References

1938 births
2010 deaths
West Bengal MLAs 1996–2001
West Bengal MLAs 2001–2006
West Bengal MLAs 2006–2011
Communist Party of India (Marxist) politicians from West Bengal
State cabinet ministers of West Bengal
Trade unionists from West Bengal